Ladies and Gentlemen, the Bible! is a book written by author and radio presenter Jonathan Goldstein.  The book is a comedic retelling of the Old Testament stories such as Adam and Eve, Samson, Noah, and David and Goliath.  Ladies and Gentlemen, the Bible! includes a story narrated by Joseph, who is skeptical of believing in Immaculate Conception, which was broadcast on the "Holiday Spectacular" episode of This American Life.

See also
Lamb: The Gospel According to Biff, Christ's Childhood Pal

References

2009 non-fiction books
Canadian non-fiction books
2009 in religion
Bible in popular culture